Palazzo del Popolo (Palace of the People) was a common civic building in Italian cities and may refer to: 

Palazzo del Popolo, Todi
Palazzo del Popolo, Orvieto
Palazzo del Popolo, Florence, better known as the Bargello
Palazzo del Popolo, San Gimignano